Emelie is a 2015 American horror thriller film directed by Michael Thelin and written by Richard Raymond Harry Herbeck. The film stars Sarah Bolger, Joshua Rush, Carly Adams, Thomas Bair, Susan Pourfar and Chris Beetem. The film was released on March 4, 2016, by Warner Bros to generally positive reviews by critics.

Plot
A girl named Anna is supposed to be babysitting a family, but is kidnapped by Emelie and a man. Emelie then poses as Anna and enters the house of Dan and Joyce, whose kids, 4-year-old Christopher, 9-year-old Sally, and 11-year-old Jacob, Anna is supposed to be babysitting. Dan and Joyce are celebrating their 13-year anniversary.

Emelie exhibits odd behavior when the parents leave. She turns off the internet modem, removes the laces from the kids' shoes, and breaks open the safe. She makes Jacob unwrap a new tampon for her, then inserts it in front of him, wiping herself. In the restaurant, Dan and Joyce are being watched by the man who helped kidnap Anna.

She shows Sally and Christopher a sex tape made by their parents. Jacob goes through Emelie's things and finds out that she's not actually Anna. He is horrified to see what Emelie has put on TV and turns it off.

At bedtime, Emelie tells Christopher and Sally a story of a mama bear who had a cub that she loved. The cub died, and Mama Bear met Skinny Hyena, who said he'd help her make a new cub. Mama Bear and Skinny Hyena got into trouble and escaped to a new land to search for a new cub. Emelie is the mama bear in the story: one night, she fell asleep with her baby on the couch, accidentally suffocating him. She met Skinny Hyena (Skinny Man) but couldn't have any more children and was unable to adopt a new child. They got passports and Emelie is seen watching children at a playground. She texts Skinny Man that she's found her "cubby".

Maggie, the kids' usual babysitter, checks in at the front door, since she hasn't heard from Anna, her friend. Maggie is skeptical that the normally rambunctious kids are so subdued. As she leaves, Sally shoves a note asking for help into Maggie's bag. Maggie reads the note in her car but Emelie knocks her unconscious.

Emelie makes the kids drink cough syrup but Jacob secretly forces himself to vomit so he can remain awake. Sally and Christopher become incapacitated. Jacob contacts his friend and neighbor Howie for help. Emelie begins gathering Christopher's things, intending to kidnap him. She then plans to smother Jacob with a pillow, only to discover that he has escaped. Maggie wakes and attacks Emelie to protect the children. Emelie kills her as Jacob hides Christopher. Meanwhile, Dan and Joyce call a cab. On their way home, Skinny Man tries to stop them by crashing his car into the taxi, but is himself killed in the collision. Police tell the parents that Skinny Man had no ID and the car was stolen.

Jacob finds Maggie's body in the basement. Emelie threatens Jacob that she will kill Sally unless Jacob brings her Christopher. She also shows Jacob Howie's jacket and tells him to meet her in the backyard with Christopher. In the backyard, Jacob subdues Emelie with Howie's lit fireworks and takes Sally back.

Police open the trunk of the crashed car and find Anna's corpse. Dan, Joyce, and the police all rush to the house. Jacob loads his siblings into his father's car in the garage. Emelie emerges and Jacob runs her over in the driveway. The police and his parents arrive, and the kids reunite with them. It is revealed that Howie is also alive, having only suffered an injury to his head.

Emelie is shown limping away from the scene, implying she escapes or is presumably caught by authorities afterward.

Cast

Release
The film premiered at the Tribeca Film Festival on April 22, 2015. The film was released on March 4, 2016, by Dark Sky Films.

Reception
The review aggregator Rotten Tomatoes gave the film an approval rating of 88%, based on 34 reviews, and an average rating of 6.54 out of 10. Metacritic reported the film had an average score of 62/100, based on 13 critics, indicating "generally favorable reviews".

References

External links
 

2015 horror thriller films
2010s psychological horror films
2015 psychological thriller films
2015 films
2015 horror films
American horror thriller films
American psychological horror films
Films shot in Buffalo, New York
2010s English-language films
2010s American films